Tejgaon is a thana of Dhaka District in the Division of Dhaka, Bangladesh. It is in the centre of Dhaka, the capital. In 2006, the boundaries of the thana were redrawn when Tejgaon Industrial Area Thana was created out of the former larger area and again in 2009 when Sher-e-Bangla Nagar Thana was created.

This is an important area of Dhaka city as the prime minister's office is here. It is bounded by Mohakhali to the north, Old Airport Road to the east and Moghbazar-Malibagh to the south and Dhanmondi to the west. It consists of several localities, including Tejgaon Industrial Area, Kawran Bazar, Nakhalpara, Shaheen Bag, Arjat para, East Raja Bazar, West Raja Bazar, Tejturi Bazar and Tejkunipara.

Geography

Demographics
According to the 2011 Bangladesh census, Tejgaon Thana had 29,622 households and a population of 148,255, 100% of whom lived in urban areas. 6.3% of the population was under the age of 5. The literacy rate (age 7 and over) was 77.6%, compared to the national average of 51.8%.

Urban layout
Historically, the area has been a centre of industrial activity in the city. Numerous plants and factories are in Tejgaon, in such diverse industries as garments, food processing, metal works, pharmaceuticals, etc. Indeed, the names of places in Tejgaon indicate as much:
 Nabisco junction (named after the Nabisco biscuit factory)
 Tibet bus stop (named after a famous cosmetics manufacturer)
 Rahim Metal Mosque
 MP Hostel
 Technical Teachers Training College (TTTC)
 Bashundhara City
 Bangladesh Water Development Board (পানি ভবন)

Economy

Tejgaon has emerged as an important business district of Dhaka. The first five-star hotel of Bangladesh, Pan Pacific Hotel Sonargaon, is in Kawran Bazar, Tejgaon. The main offices of the Daily Prothom Alo, the Daily Star (Bangladesh), The Independent, and several other newspapers are here. Also, the office and studio of television channels Ekushey Television, NTV, ATN Bangla, Boishakhi TV, Channel i and Channel 1 are at Tejgaon. The main campus of Ahsanullah University of Science and Technology is here as well.

Tejgaon has the headquarters for the Trading Corporation of Bangladesh.

Banks
Almost every bank operating in Bangladesh has an outlet in Tejgaon. Foreign banks such as Citi, HSBC and Standard Chartered have branches here, with HSBC and Standard Chartered having multiple ATM booths in the area. Local banks like BRAC Bank, United Commercial Bank Limited, AB Bank, Dutch Bangla Bank, Jamuna Bank have branches. ICICI Bank Ltd., second largest bank of India, has a representative office in UTC building next to Bashundhara city.

Restaurants
There are many well-known restaurants in Tejgaon: Star Hotel and Restaurant, Marine Restaurant, Park Town, Yan-Ji Chinese Restaurant, Hiramon Kabab Ghar, Ciao Bistro and Aromaz at Hotel Pan Pacific Shonargaon, Dominous Pizza and Salt Grill Restaurant in Bashundhara City and others.

There are bars in Tejgaon: Hotel Red Button and Balcony Bar at Hotel Pan Pacific Shonargaon, etc.

Points of interest

 Prime Minister's Office
 Jatiyo Sangshad Bhaban
Bangabandhu Sheikh Mujibur Rahman Novo Theatre (Planetarium)
 Holy Rosary Church (Dhaka)
 Bashundhara City
 Bijoy Shoroni Fountain
 SAARC Fountain
 Island of Pearl-Ratna dip in front of Prime Minister Office
Pan Pacific Sonargaon
 Bangladesh Air Force Museum

Parks
Chandrima Uddan (sometimes called Zia Uddan) is a park beside the Jatiyo Sangshad Bhaban. The name means "Moonlight Park" in Bengali.

The park is where the former Bangladeshi President Ziaur Rahman was buried. It is connected to the road with a bridge which runs over the Crescent Lake. The park is a very common place to spend leisure time. It is very popular for morning and evening walks.

There is Farmgate Park, which is a very popular destination for young people.

Airport
Tejgaon Airport (ICAO: VGTJ) at Tejgaon, was the country's sole international airport before the construction of the new Hazrat Shahjalal International Airport (IATA: DAC, ICAO: VGHS) which was named Zia International airport (ICAO: VGZR).

The first Royal Indian Air Force light fighter landed on the under-construction runway of Tejgaon at the beginning of 1943.

Following the transfer of civilian flights to the new Hazrat Shahjalal International Airport in 1981, Tejgaon was taken under the control of the Bangladesh Air Force & Bangladesh Army.

Education
Over the last 50 years many schools, colleges and private universities have developed around the area — Bangladesh University of Textiles, Dhaka Polytechnic Institute, Hamdard Public College, Government Science College, Holy Cross College, Tejgaon College, Tejgaon Govt High School, Tejgaon Government Girls' High School, Green University of Bangladesh, B.A.F Shaheen College, and BAF Shaheen English Medium School are the most well known. The National Institute of Ear, Nose and Throat (ENT) is also in Tejgaon.

Gallery

See also
 Upazilas of Bangladesh
 Districts of Bangladesh
 Divisions of Bangladesh

References

Thanas of Dhaka
Neighbourhoods in Bangladesh